Sonal Bhadresh Shah (born 1986) is an American actress and voice artist who is best known for playing Dr. Sonja "Sunny" Dey on TV's Scrubs.

Early life and education 
Shah was born and raised in Wheaton, Illinois. Her parents, Bhadresh and Mrudula Shah, are Gujarati Jains who moved from Mumbai, Maharashtra, India to the United States in 1970.

Shah graduated from Wheaton Warrenville South High School. She was named the 1998 DuPage County Fair Queen in July 1998.

Shah graduated cum laude from Loyola University in Chicago with a major in theatre, minors in psychology, biology and chemistry, and a concentration in pre-medicine. While a student at Loyola, Shah joined the Alpha Sigma Alpha sorority. "I sincerely planned to go to medical school," Shah told a Wheaton, Illinois newspaper in March 2009. "I love studying science, but I realized that my passion for performing outweighed my passion for wanting to be a doctor."

After graduation, Shah became a staple in the Chicago Theatre Community and performed with The Tony Award Winning Goodman Theatre among others. She is a founding member of Rasaka Theatre Company, which explores South Asian plays and playwrights, and supplemented her acting education at The Moscow Art Theatre School at Harvard University.

Acting career 

Shah moved to Los Angeles in 2006 and began appearing in commercials and sketch comedy. She also has acted with Second City theatres in Chicago and Los Angeles.

In 2009, Shah began appearing on Scrubs as Dr. Sonja "Sunny" Dey, who is one of the young interns newly cast in the show's eighth season. In addition, Shah appeared in the show's webisode series Scrubs: Interns. Shah returns as a guest star on the ninth season of Scrubs, in the fifth episode.

Shah also has a role in the 2009 teen comedy film Ratko: The Dictator's Son, a National Lampoon production.

Selected filmography

External links

References 

21st-century American comedians
American stand-up comedians
American women comedians
American comedians of Indian descent
American film actresses
American television actresses
American actresses of Indian descent
Actors from Wheaton, Illinois
Actresses from Illinois
American people of Gujarati descent
Comedians from Illinois
Gujarati people
Living people
1986 births
21st-century American actresses